Skien IK is an ice hockey team in Skien, Norway. They currently play in the Norwegian Second Division, the third level of Norwegian ice hockey. The teams plays its home games in the Skien Ishall.

History
The club was founded in 1965. They played in the Norwegian First Division in the years 2012-14.

External links
Official website 
Team profile on eurohockey.com

Ice hockey teams in Norway
Ice hockey clubs established in 1965
1965 establishments in Norway
Sport in Vestfold og Telemark
Sport in Skien